UFC 49: Unfinished Business was a mixed martial arts event held by the Ultimate Fighting Championship on August 21, 2004, at the MGM Grand Arena in Las Vegas, Nevada.  The event was broadcast live on pay-per-view in the United States, and later released on DVD.

History
It featured the anticipated rubber match between Light Heavyweight Champion Vitor Belfort and Randy Couture, following a disappointing doctor's stoppage in their last encounter at UFC 46.

This event featured the last UFC fight in the lightweight division until UFC 58 on March 4, 2006.

Results

See also 
 Ultimate Fighting Championship
 List of UFC champions
 List of UFC events
 2004 in UFC

References

External links
Official UFC past events page

Ultimate Fighting Championship events
2004 in mixed martial arts
Mixed martial arts in Las Vegas
2004 in sports in Nevada
MGM Grand Garden Arena